The 1903 Alabama Crimson Tide baseball team represented the Alabama Crimson Tide of the University of Alabama in the 1903 college baseball season, winning the SIAA championship.

Schedule and results

References

Alabama
Alabama Crimson Tide baseball seasons
Southern Intercollegiate Athletic Association baseball champion seasons
1903 in sports in Alabama